Halvor Heggtveit (March 16, 1907 in Leland, North Dakota, U.S. – January 18, 1996 in Ottawa, Ontario, Canada) of Norwegian stock and a resident of Canada since the age of five. 

He attended Ottawa Collegiate Institute in Ottawa, Ontario from 1918 to 1923. 

He was a long time member of Ottawa Ski Club, including club director, captain of the Traffic Corps (ski safety - ca 1940s). 

Family owned "Heggtveit Sporting Goods", who were specialists in ski equipment and repairs.  They were located at Albert & O'Connor in Ottawa, Ontario.  Anne Heggtveit Alpine Ski gold medalist at the 1960 Winter Olympic Games was his daughter.

Cross-Country Skiing Championships
In the winter of 1933-34, he made a clean sweep in the cross-country races with the championship of the Ottawa Ski Club, City of Ottawa, Province of Ontario, and the Dominion Championship. He attributed his successes to one thing: training, hard and constant training. 

Other highlights: 
 Ontario Championship, 11 Feb 1934, Caledon(near Toronto), Ontario, won the race in 1h. 27 min. 50 sec. 
 Quebec Championship, 18 Feb 1934, Shawbridge, Quebec, came first of 30 skiers with a time of 1.05.17; J. P. Taylor (2nd) 1.07.07; E. Laflamme (3rd) 1.10.13.
 Champion Ski Runner of Canada, Shawinigan Falls, Quebec, 24-25 Feb 1934, covering the eleven mile course in 1.19.52; John Pringle Taylor was only 24 seconds behind (1.20.16); Bud Clark (St. Pat's) came third, in 1.22.43.

Olympics
He qualified to represent Canada in 18km Cross-Country Skiing at the 1932 Winter Olympics in Lake Placid, New York, USA.  Family and business obligations precluded his participation.

Other Sports
Rifle Shooting - Dominion of Canada Marksman - Gold and Silver pins.  Interestingly, Halvor was a junior classmate of Desmond Burke, who in 1924 at age 19 became the youngest winner of the King’s Prize.

He was a long time member of the Ottawa New Edinburgh Canoe Club (1931-1993).

Honours
Ottawa Recreational Association Sports Hall of Fame - 1978 Sportsman of the Year 

He was inducted into the Lisgar Collegiate Institute Athletic Wall of Fame in 2018.

References

External links
 Ottawa Ski Club newsletters on the Gatineau Valley History Society

1907 births
1996 deaths
Canadian male cross-country skiers
Sportspeople from North Dakota
Lisgar Collegiate Institute alumni
American emigrants to Canada